Francesca is an Italian female given name, derived from the Latin male name Franciscus meaning 'the Frenchman' It is widely used in most Romance languages, including Italian, French and Catalan, and place of origin is Italy. It is derived from the same source as the female name Frances, and the male names Francesc, Francesco and Francis.

People named Francesca
Daniel Francesca, Danish esports player
Francesca Alderisi, Italian television presenter and politician
Francesca Allinson, English author and musician
Francesca Annis, British actress
Julia Francesca Barretto, Filipino actress
Francesca Battistelli, American Christian musician
Francesca Beard, Malaysian performance poet
Francesca Caccini, Italian composer and singer of the early Baroque
Francesca Anna Canfield, American poet and translator
Francesca Capaldi, American child actress
Francesca Cumani, English racing presenter for ITV
Francesca Cuzzoni, Italian operatic soprano
Francesca da Rimini, 13th-century Italian adulterer
Francesca Dani, Italian cosplay model
Francesca Gagnon, Canadian singer and performer for Cirque du Soleil
Francesca Galli, Italian road racing cyclist
Francesca Hayward, English ballerina
Francesca Le, American pornographic actress
Francesca Lia Block, American author of the Weetzie Bat series
Francesca Lubiani, Italian tennis player
Francesca Martinez, British comedian
Francesca Petitjean, French former bodybuilder and pornographic actress
Francesca Piccinini, Italian volleyball player
Francesca Salvalajo, Italian backstroke swimmer
Francesa Sarah of Safed, 16th-century Jewish mystic
Francesca Schiavone, Italian tennis player
Francesca Semoso, Papuan politician and broadcaster from Bougainville
Francesca Simon, American author of the Horrid Henry series
Francesca Stavrakopoulou, British theologian and broadcaster
Francesca Velicu, Romanian ballet dancer
Francesca Woodman, American photographer
Piero della Francesca, Italian painter
Francheska Yarbusova, Russian artist and wife of director Yuriy

Fictional characters
Francesca, a character from the Rankin/Bass classic Mad Monster Party
Francesca ("Frankie"), the eponymous main character from Melina Marchetta's Saving Francesca
Francesca Lucchini, a character from the anime/manga series Strike Witches
Francesca, a character from the series by Lauren Kate: Fallen
Francesca or Franky, a character from Freaky Green Eyes
Francesca da Rimini or da Polenta, a character from Dante's Inferno
Francesca Russo, a character from The Wizards Return: Alex vs. Alex
Francesca Caviglia, a character from Violetta
Francesca Hollingsworth (Frankie), a character from the Degrassi franchise
Francesca Danelli, a character from Bride of Re-Animator movie (1989)
Francesca "Cesca" Montoya, a character from Waterloo Road
Francesca Moretti, a character from Argentina, tierra de amor y venganza
Francesca Johnson, a character from The Bridges of Madison County

Translations

 (Fúlǎngxīsīkǎ), 弗朗西斯 (Fúlǎngxīsī) or 弗朗切斯卡 (Fúlǎngqièsīkǎ)

 (Frangískī) or less originally Greek versions Φραντζέσκα (Frantzéska) and Φραντσέσκα (Frantséska)

 (Furanchesuka)
 (Peulancheseuka)
 (shortened Pancha)

 (Frančeska)

 (shortened Paca or Pancha)
Maltese: Frangiska (shortened Cikka)

See also
List of people starting with "Francesca"
Hurricane Francesca (disambiguation)
Francisca (given name)
Anna Anderson (b. 1896 - d. 1984) a famous impostor whose real name was Franziska Schanzkowska''' who claimed to be Grand Duchess Anastasia Nikolaevna of Russia (b. 1901 - d. 1918).

References

Italian feminine given names